Véronique Jannot (born 7 May 1957) is a French actress and singer. She was born in Annecy, Haute-Savoie.

Discography

Albums
2012: Tout doux

Singles
1975: "L'Atlantique" (with Pierre Bachelet)
1981: "Pause café"
1982: "J'ai fait l'amour avec la mer" (with Pierre Bachelet)
1982: "Comédie comédie" (with Pierre Bachelet and Jean-Pierre Lang)
1984: "Désir, désir" (with Laurent Voulzy)
1985: "Si t'as pas compris"
1985: "Vague à l'âme"
1985: "C'est trop facile de dire je t'aime"
1985: "La Première Scène"
1986: "Ma repentance"
1986: "Fragile fragile"
1988: "Mon héros préféré"
1988: "Aviateur" (certified silver)
1988: "Chagrin"
1989: "Love me forever"
1989: "Reviens-me dire"

Theater

Filmography

Participation in Dancing with the Stars (2011)

From October 8 to October 29, Véronique Jannot was one of the candidates in Danse avec les stars alongside the dancer Grégoire Lyonnet.

External links
 
 Her official website 

1957 births
Living people
People from Annecy
French film actresses
French television actresses
French women singers
French women pop singers